Erdut Castle is a castle in Erdut, Croatia. 

Built in the 14th century, Erdut Castle lies on a bluff 70 metres above the Danube.  The surrounding area below the bluff is completely flat, which provided an excellent view of any marauding hordes invading from the east.
The settlement and castle is first mentioned as Ardud in 1335. The documents of the 15th century in Titel provost and the Bánffy family owned estate is mentioned in the Erdődy, dated 1552 and 1687 between the Turkish occupations.

The castle was damaged in July 1991, during the Croatian War of Independence, in an artillery attack launched by the Yugoslav People's Army (JNA). In the aftermath of the attack, Croatian authorities sent a list of Croatia's cultural monuments marked with the protective sign of the Hague Convention for the Protection of Cultural Property in the Event of Armed Conflict to the Yugoslav Defence Ministry and all JNA headquarters.

The 1,3 million kunas reconstruction of the site funded from the European Regional Development Fund was announced in late July 2022.

References

Castles in Croatia
Buildings and structures in Osijek-Baranja County